Battle Creek is a stream in Minnesota. It rises in Battle Creek Lake in Woodbury, passing through residential Maplewood and St. Paul before emptying into the Mississippi River via Pigs Eye Lake. It is followed for much of its length by walking paths. It is the eponym for the Battle Creek neighborhood of Saint Paul.

Battle Creek was named in commemoration of an 1842 battle between the Ojibwe and Sioux Sioux indians.

See also
List of rivers of Minnesota

References

Minnesota Watersheds
USGS Hydrologic Unit Map - State of Minnesota (1974)

Rivers of Minnesota
Rivers of Washington County, Minnesota
Rivers of Ramsey County, Minnesota
Tributaries of the Mississippi River